Clavin is a surname. Notable people with the surname include:

 Chris Clavin (born 1973), American musician and record label owner
 Nicholas Clavin (born 1948), Irish footballer
 Patricia Clavin, British academic
 Paul Clavin, French scientist

See also
 Cliff Clavin, fictional character